Jakub Krčín (June 18, 1535  – 1604) was a prominent Czech Renaissance architect and engineer. 

Krčín was born in Kolín.  He was a prolific designer and founder of fish ponds, and is particularly known for his work on the Fishponds of the Třeboň Basin, where he oversaw the construction of the Rožmberk Pond, as well as the restoration or creation of many others.

See also
 Štěpánek Netolický

External links
Short Biography in English
Further Biographical Information and Work 
Detailed biography with the only available picture of Krčín 

Czech architects
1535 births
1604 deaths